In the mathematical discipline of measure theory, a Banach measure is a certain type of content used to formalize geometric area in problems vulnerable to the axiom of choice.  

Traditionally, intuitive notions of area are formalized as a classical, countably additive measure.  This has the unfortunate effect of leaving some sets with no well-defined area; a consequence is that some geometric transformations do not leave area invariant, the substance of the Banach–Tarski paradox.  A Banach measure is a type of generalized measure to elide this problem. 

As Vitali's paradox shows, Banach measures cannot be strengthened to countably additive ones.

Stefan Banach showed that it is possible to define a Banach measure for the Euclidean plane, consistent with the usual Lebesgue measure.

The existence of this measure proves the impossibility of a Banach–Tarski paradox in two dimensions: it is not possible to decompose a two-dimensional set of finite Lebesgue measure into finitely many sets that can be reassembled into a set with a different measure, because this would violate the properties of the Banach measure that extends the Lebesgue measure.

References

External links 

 Stefan Banach bio

Measures (measure theory)